Sara Catarina Costa Pontes Ribeiro (born 31 May 1990), known as Catarina Ribeiro, is a Portuguese long distance runner who competes in international level events. Her highest achievement is winning a Bronze medal at the 2011 European Athletics U23 Championships in Ostrava.

Ribeiro is expected to compete in the women's marathon at the 2020 Summer Olympics.

References

1990 births
Living people
People from Lousada
Portuguese female long-distance runners
Portuguese female marathon runners
World Athletics Championships athletes for Portugal
Athletes (track and field) at the 2020 Summer Olympics
Olympic athletes of Portugal
Sportspeople from Porto District